"Pain" is a song by American hip hop group De La Soul, featuring vocals from American hip hop recording artist Snoop Dogg. was released on June 1, 2016 as the second single of their ninth studio album and the Anonymous Nobody..., with the record labels AOI Records and Kobalt Label Services. The song was produced by Supa Dave West.

Music video
The official music video for the song was released on December 7, 2016 and features many workers singing along with the song while working.

Track listing 
Digital download
"Pain" (featuring Snoop Dogg) – 4:39

Charts

Weekly charts

References 

2016 songs
De La Soul songs
Snoop Dogg songs
Songs written by Snoop Dogg
G-funk songs
2016 singles